Mellersh is a surname. Notable people with the surname include:

Francis Mellersh (cricketer) (born 1786), English amateur cricketer
Francis Mellersh (RAF officer), KBE, AFC (1898–1955), Royal Naval Air Service aviator, flying ace, senior commander in the Royal Air Force
H. E. L. Mellersh (1897–1980), British author, primarily of text books

See also
Meller